, officially , was the name for Singapore when it was occupied and ruled by the Empire of Japan, following the fall and surrender of British military forces on 15 February 1942 during World War II.

Japanese military forces occupied it after defeating the combined British, Indian, Australian, Malayan and the Straits Settlements garrison in the Battle of Singapore. The occupation was to become a major turning point in the histories of several nations, including those of Japan, Britain, and Singapore.

Singapore was officially returned to British colonial rule on 12 September 1945, following the formal signing of the surrender at the Municipal Building, currently known as City Hall. After the return of the British, there was growing political sentiments amongst the local populace in tandem with the rise of anti-colonial and nationalist fervor, as many felt that the British were no longer competent with the administration and defence of the crown colony and its inhabitants.

Shortly after the war, the Straits Settlements was dissolved and Singapore became a separate crown colony in 1946. It would go on to achieve self-governance in 1959, before becoming a sovereign city-state a few years later in 1965. The day of the surrender of the British to the Japanese in 1942 continues to be commemorated in Singapore with Total Defence Day, which is marked annually on 15 February.

Events leading to the occupation 

The Japanese captured all of Malaya during the Malayan Campaign in a little more than two months. The garrison defending Singapore surrendered on 15 February 1942, only a week after the invasion of the island commenced. Then British Prime Minister Winston Churchill called the fall of Singapore "the worst disaster and largest capitulation in British history".

Life during the occupation

Time of mass-terror

The main army which took Malaya, the 25th Army, was redeployed to other fronts such as the Philippines and New Guinea shortly after the fall of Singapore. The Kempeitai (the Japanese military police), which was the dominant occupation unit in Singapore, committed numerous atrocities towards the common people. They introduced the system of "Sook Ching", meaning "purging through purification" in Chinese, to get rid of those, especially ethnic Chinese, deemed to be hostile to the Empire of Japan (anti-Japanese elements in the local population). The Sook Ching massacre allegedly claimed the lives of between 25,000 and 55,000 ethnic Chinese in Singapore as well as in neighboring Malaya. These victims, mainly males between the ages of 18 to 50, were rounded up and taken to deserted spots and remote locations around the island, such as Changi Beach, Punggol Point, and Siglap, and killed systematically using machine guns and rifles. 

Moreover, the Kempeitai established an island-wide network of local informants to help them identify those they suspected as anti-Japanese. These informers were well-paid by the Kempeitai and had no fear of being arrested for their loyalty was not in question to the occupation forces. These informers worked at Kempeitai screening centres where the Japanese attempted to single out anti-Japanese elements for execution. Japanese soldiers and Kempeitai officers patrolled the streets often and all commoners had to bow to them with respect when they passed by. Those who failed to do so would be slapped, punished, beaten and some people would even be taken away to imprisonment or even face execution.

Other changes to life in Singapore
To discourage Western influence, which Japan sought to eliminate from the very start of their invasion, the Japanese set up schools and education institutions and pressured the local people to learn their language (Japanese). Textbooks and language guidebooks were printed in Japanese and radios and movies were broadcast and screened in Japanese. Every morning, school-children had to stand facing the direction of Japan (in the case of Singapore, looking northeast) and sing the Japanese national anthem ("Kimigayo"). Japanese propaganda banners and posters also went up all around Singapore, as did many Japanese Rising Sun flags raised and hung across many major buildings.

Scarcity of basic needs

Basic resources, ranging from food to medication, were scarce during the occupation. The prices of basic necessities increased drastically over the three and a half years due to hyperinflation. For example, the price of rice increased from $5 per 100 catties (about ) to $5,000 by the end of the occupation between August and September 1945. The Japanese issued ration cards, also known as "Peace Living Certificates" to limit the amount of resources distributed to the civilian population. Adults could purchase  of rice per month and children received  accordingly. The amount of rice for adults was reduced by 25% as the war progressed, as much of the scarce rice supplies were sent to feed the Japanese military.

The Japanese issued "Banana Money" (so referred to due to the image of a banana tree printed on most of such notes of the currency) as their main currency during the occupation period since British Straits currency became rarer and was subsequently phased out when the Japanese took over in 1942. They instituted elements of a command economy in which there were restrictions on the demand and supply of resources, thus creating a popular black market from which the locals could obtain key scarce resources such as rice, meat, and medicine. The "Banana" currency started to suffer from high inflation and dropped drastically in value because the occupation authorities would simply print more whenever they needed it; consequently on the black market, Straits currency was more widely used.

Food availability and quality decreased greatly. Sweet potatoes, tapiocas and yams became the staple food of most diets of many Singaporeans because they were considerably cheaper than rice and could also be grown fast and easily in backyard gardens. They were then turned into a variety of dishes, as both desserts and all three meals of the day. Such foods helped to fend starvation off, with limited success in terms of nutrients gained, and new ways of consuming sweet potatoes, tapiocas and yams with other products were regularly invented and created to help stave off the monotony. Both the British colonial and Japanese occupation authorities encouraged their local population to grow their own food even if they had the smallest amount of land. The encouragement and production were similar to what occurred with "Victory Gardens" in Western nations (predominantly in Europe) during World War II as food supplies grew ever more scarce. Ipomoea aquatica, which grew relatively easily and flourished relatively well near water sources, became a popular food-crop just as it did the other vegetables.

Education 
Faye Yuan Kleeman, the author of Under an Imperial Sun: Japanese Colonial Literature of Taiwan and the South wrote that it was the most successful of such schools in Southeast Asia. During the occupation, the Japanese had also opened the Shonan First People's School.

Allied attacks

Singapore was the target of various operations masterminded by Allied forces to disrupt Japanese military activities. Lyon led another operation, codenamed "Rimau", with the same objective almost a year later and sank three ships. Lyon and 13 of his men were killed fighting the Japanese. The other 10 men who participated in the operation were captured, charged with espionage in a kangaroo court and subsequently executed.

Lim Bo Seng of Force 136 led another operation, code-named Gustavus, he recruited and trained hundreds of secret agents through intensive military intelligence missions from China and India. He set up the Sino-British guerrilla task force Force 136 in 1942 with Captain John Davis of the Special Operations Executive (SOE).
Operation Gustavus was aimed at establishing an espionage network in Malaya and Singapore to gather intelligence about Japanese activities, and thereby aid the British in Operation Zipper – the code name for their plan to take back Singapore from the Japanese. Force 136 was eventually disbanded after the war.

In August 1945, two XE class midget submarines of the Royal Navy took part in Operation Struggle, a plan to infiltrate Singapore Harbour and sabotage the Japanese cruisers  and  using limpet mines. They inflicted heavy damage on Takao, earning Lieutenant Ian Edward Fraser the Victoria Cross. From November 1944 to May 1945, Singapore was subjected to air raids by British and American long-range bomber units.

Naval facilities and docks in Singapore were also bombed on eleven occasions by American air units between November 1944 and May 1945. These attacks caused some damage to their targets but also killed a number of civilians. Most Singaporeans, however, welcomed the raids as they were seen as heralding Singapore's liberation from Japanese rule.

End of the occupation 

On 6 August 1945, the United States detonated an atomic bomb over the Japanese city of Hiroshima. Sixteen hours later, US President Harry S. Truman called again for Japan's surrender and warned it to "expect a rain of ruin from the air, the like of which has never been seen on this earth." On 8 August 1945, the Soviet Union declared war on Japan and the next day invaded the Japanese puppet state of Manchukuo. Later that day, the United States dropped a second atomic bomb, this time on the Japanese city of Nagasaki. Following those events, Emperor Hirohito intervened and ordered the Supreme Council for the Direction of the War to accept the terms the Allies had set down in the Potsdam Declaration to end the war. After several more days of behind-the-scenes negotiations and a failed coup d'état, Emperor Hirohito gave a recorded radio address across the Empire on 15 August. In the radio address, he announced the surrender of Japan to the Allies.

The surrender ceremony was held on 2 September aboard the United States Navy battleship USS Missouri at which officials from the Japanese government signed the Japanese Instrument of Surrender, thereby ending the hostilities.

On 12 September 1945, a surrender instrument was signed at the Singapore Municipal Building. That was followed by a celebration at the Padang, which included a victory parade. Lord Louis Mountbatten, Supreme Allied Commander of South East Asia Command, came to Singapore to receive the formal surrender of the Japanese forces in the region from General Seishirō Itagaki on behalf of General Hisaichi Terauchi. A British military administration, using surrendered Japanese troops as security forces, was formed to govern the island until March 1946.

After the Japanese surrendered, there was a state of instability (anomie) in Singapore, as the British had not yet arrived to take control. The Japanese occupiers had a considerably weakened hold over the populace. There were widespread incidents of looting and revenge killing. Much of the infrastructure had been wrecked, including the harbour facilities and the electricity, water supply and telephone services. It took four or five years for the economy to return to prewar levels. When British troops finally arrived, they were met with cheering and fanfare.

Banana money became worthless after the occupation ended.

Memorials

To keep alive the memory of the Japanese occupation and its lessons learned for future generations, the Singapore government erected several memorials with some at the former massacre sites:

Civilian War Memorial

Spearheaded and managed by the Singapore Chinese Chamber of Commerce and Industry, the Civilian War Memorial is located in the War Memorial Park at Beach Road. Comprising four white concrete columns, this 61 meters tall memorial commemorates the civilian dead of all races. It was built after thousands of remains were discovered all over Singapore during the urban redevelopment boom in the early 1960s. The memorial was officially unveiled by Singapore's first prime minister Lee Kuan Yew on the 25th anniversary of the start of the Japanese occupation in 1967. It was constructed with part of the S$50 million 'blood debt' compensation paid by the Japanese government in October 1966. Speaking at the unveiling ceremony, Lee said:

On 15 February every year, memorial services (opened to the public) are held at the memorial.

Sook Ching Centre Monument

The site of this monument lies within the Hong Lim Complex in Chinatown. The inscription on the monument reads:

Changi Beach Massacre Monument
The site of this monument is located in Changi Beach Park (near Camp Site 2) in the eastern part of Singapore. The inscription on the monument reads:

Punggol Beach Massacre Monument
The site of this monument is located off Punggol Road in northeastern Singapore. The inscription on the monument reads:

Popular culture 
The Japanese occupation of Singapore has been depicted in media and popular culture, including films, television series and books

Books
The Singapore Grip (1978), a comic-dramatic novel about British merchant families in Singapore and their complicated relationships with each other, other European expats, and other residents, including Chinese immigrants. The novel culminates in the invasion of the Malaysian peninsula and Singapore's occupation by the Japanese, and includes several vivid battle scenes written from the point of view of a Japanese soldier in a tank battalion. 
 Ovidia Yu's Su Lin series of mysteries, beginning with The Frangipani Tree Mystery (2017), start off in 1930s Singapore and continue into the period of Japanese occupation.
Film 
 Leftenan Adnan (2000), a Malaysian film set in the Battle of Singapore

Television series
 Early episodes of Tenko, a BBC/ABC production.
 The Heroes (1988), an Australian-British co-production.
 Heroes II: The Return (1991), an Australian miniseries.
 The Last Rhythm (1996), a Chinese language series produced by the Television Corporation of Singapore (TCS).
 The Price of Peace (1997), produced by the TCS.
 A War Diary (2001), produced by MediaCorp.
 In Pursuit of Peace (2001), produced by MediaCorp.
 Changi (2001), produced by the Australian Broadcasting Corporation.
 The Journey: Tumultuous Times (2014), produced by MediaCorp.
 The Forgotten Army - Azaadi Ke Liye (2020), produced by Kabir Khan Films Pvt. Ltd.

List of monuments and historical sites 
Civilian War Memorial
Kranji War Memorial and Cemetery
Changi Chapel and Museum
YMCA on Orchard Road
Alexandra Hospital grounds
Old Ford Motor Factory

See also 
History of Singapore
Japan–Singapore relations
Bombing of Singapore (1944–45)
List of years in Singapore
Hasuda Zenmei

Notes

References

Bibliography

External links 

 Fall of Malaya and Singapore, a detailed history of the Battle of Singapore.
Archive of The Syonan Times. The Syonan Times substituted The Straits Times from 1942 to 1945 under several mastheads.

 
States and territories established in 1942
States and territories disestablished in 1945
Former Japanese colonies